"Everything I Wanted" is a 2019 song by Billie Eilish.

Everything I Wanted may also refer to:

 "Everything I Wanted" (The Bangles song), 1990
 "Everything I Wanted" (Dannii Minogue song), 1997